Desert Blue is a 1998 American comedy-drama film written and directed by Morgan J. Freeman, starring Brendan Sexton III, Kate Hudson, Christina Ricci, Casey Affleck, Sara Gilbert and John Heard.

Plot 
A rising Hollywood starlet becomes "marooned" in a small desert town while on a roadtrip with her father. There, she gets to know the town's rather eccentric residents, including one whose hobby is pipe bombs and another who is trying to carry out his father's dream of building a waterpark in the desert.

Cast

Soundtrack
The soundtrack features songs by The Candyskins, Rilo Kiley, Janis Ian, and others.

Reception
Rotten Tomatoes, review aggregator, reports that 37% of 19 surveyed critics gave the film a positive review; the average rating was 5/10.  Glenn Lovell of Variety called it "a cloying, mechanically plotted comedy". Lawrence Van Gelder of The New York Times wrote, "The graceful literary and directorial touch of Morgan J. Freeman turns these youngsters into individuals rather than cinema's customary caricatures".  John Anderson of the Los Angeles Times wrote, "It's a small story, perhaps even an ephemeral movie, but Desert Blue also has a novelistic capacity for character and setting, without either the maudlin sentimentality or gratuitous vulgarity of most teen-oriented movies."  Roger Ebert of The Chicago Sun-Times rated it three out of four stars and compared it to The Last Picture Show and U Turn, saying that it is the "herbal tea" version of the latter. Lisa Schwarzbaum  of Entertainment Weekly gave the film a grade of C and described the setting as "yet another indie drama set in a burg reminiscent, by way of aggressive eccentricity, of TV's Northern Exposure."

References

External links

1998 films
1998 comedy-drama films
American comedy-drama films
1990s English-language films
Films directed by Morgan J. Freeman
1998 independent films
Films produced by Andrea Sperling
The Samuel Goldwyn Company films
1990s American films